Apostolos Grozos (12 June 1892 – 22 June 1981) was a leader of the Communist Party of Greece (KKE).

He was born in Komotini, Thrace (then part of the Adrianople Vilayet of the Ottoman Empire) in 1892. On December 30, 1952, at the 4th Plenary session, he was elected leader of the KKE's Central Committee Directorate. In 1956, following the deposing of Nikolaos Zachariadis from the position as general secretary, Grozos was appointed temporary leader of the KKE. He was replaced by Konstantinos Koligiannis in 1958.

Grozos died in 1981 in Bucharest.

Sources
 Kathimerini, 5 January 1953

1892 births
1981 deaths
People from Komotini
People from Adrianople vilayet
Greeks from the Ottoman Empire
General Secretaries of the Communist Party of Greece
Exiles of the Greek Civil War in the Soviet Union